Margaret Grun Kibben (born 1960) is a U.S. Presbyterian minister who is the chaplain of the United States House of Representatives. She served as the 26th Chief of Chaplains of the United States Navy from 2014 to 2018; she was formerly the 18th Chaplain of the United States Marine Corps (CHMC) and the Deputy Chief of Chaplains of the United States Navy from 2010 to 2014. Kibben was the first woman to hold each of these positions.

Early life and education
A native of Warrington, Pennsylvania, Kibben entered active duty in the U.S. Navy in 1986. She earned a B.A. degree from Goucher College in Towson, Maryland in 1982. Kibben received both her Masters of Divinity (1986) and her Doctor of Ministry (2002) degrees from Princeton Theological Seminary, Princeton, New Jersey. She also earned an M.A. degree in National Security and Strategic Studies from the Naval War College in 1996. Kibben was a senior fellow at the United States Institute of Peace.

Military career
Kibben's Marine Corps assignments have included Marine Corps Base Quantico, Virginia, where she served with Headquarters and Service Battalion, Security Battalion, the Brig, Marine Corps Air Facility and the president's Helicopter Squadron, HMX-1. She also served with the Marines of Second Force Service Support Group Camp Lejeune, N.C., making deployments to both Turkey and Norway. Later she was assigned to the Marine Corps Combat Development Command in Quantico as the doctrine writer for Religious Ministry.

Kibben's Navy assignments include the U.S. Naval Academy in Annapolis, Maryland as the first female chaplain. She was the Navy Chaplain Corps historian at the Chaplain Resource Board and the command chaplain, in Norfolk, Virginia. As U.S. 3rd Fleet chaplain, Kibben was responsible for the training and certification of all carrier strike group and expeditionary strike group religious ministry teams. She completed a deployment as the command chaplain, Combined Forces Command Afghanistan as an individual augmentee.

Kibben was detailed to the Office of the Chief of Navy Chaplains, first serving as the director for Force Structure and Community Management and then as the executive assistant to the chief of Navy Chaplains.

Kibben was the 18th Chaplain of the United States Marine Corps (CHMC) and the Chief of Chaplains of the United States Navy. She was the first woman to hold this office.

The Chief of Navy Chaplains is the Senior Chaplain in the Navy, the Head of the U.S. Navy Chaplain Corps, and the Director of Religious Ministry Support for the Department of the Navy. He or she advises the Secretary of the Navy, the Commandant of the Marine Corps, the Chief of Naval Operations, and the Commandant of the Coast Guard "on all matters pertaining to religion within the Navy, United States Marine Corps, and United States Coast Guard."

After retirement from the Navy, Kibben became a lecturer in Leadership and Ethics at the School of Engineering of the Catholic University of America.

Chaplain of the House of Representatives
On December 31, 2020, House Speaker Nancy Pelosi appointed Rear Adm. Margaret Grun Kibben as the next House chaplain, making her the first woman to serve as chaplain in either chamber of Congress. Her third day as House chaplain was marked by both the 2021 United States Electoral College vote count and the accompanying violent protests, during which she offered prayers upon the evacuation of House members. She was reelected Chaplain of the United States House of Representatives on January 7, 2023, after Kevin McCarthy was elected Speaker.

Awards and decorations

Personal life
Kibben is the daughter of William Allen Grun and Jean Marie "Micki" (McFall) Grun. She has one sister. Her father served in the Naval Reserve during World War II, retiring from service as a lieutenant commander.

Kibben is married to Timothy J. Kibben, a retired U.S. Marine Corps lieutenant colonel.  The couple have a daughter.

See also

Armed Forces Chaplains Board

References

External links

U.S. House biography

|-

|-

|-

1960 births
Living people
20th-century American women
21st-century American clergy
21st-century American naval officers
21st-century American women
People from Bucks County, Pennsylvania
Presbyterians from Pennsylvania
Goucher College alumni
Princeton Theological Seminary alumni
American Presbyterian ministers
Women Christian clergy
United States Navy chaplains
Military personnel from Pennsylvania
Chaplains of the United States Marine Corps
Female United States Marine Corps personnel
Naval War College alumni
Recipients of the Legion of Merit
United States Navy admirals
Female admirals of the United States Navy
Chiefs of Chaplains of the United States Navy
Recipients of the Navy Distinguished Service Medal
Catholic University of America faculty
Chaplains of the United States House of Representatives
American women academics